The Saskatchewan Rush are a lacrosse team based in Saskatoon, Saskatchewan playing in the National Lacrosse League (NLL). The 2018 season is the 13th in franchise history, 3rd in Saskatchewan. originally they played in Edmonton. this season they have won their 3rd title in 4 years.

Current standings

Game log

Regular season
Reference:

Playoffs

Current roster

Entry Draft
The 2017 NLL Entry Draft took place on September 18, 2017. The Rush made the following selections:

Runners (Top 10)

Note: GP = Games played; G = Goals; A = Assists; Pts = Points; LB = Loose Balls; PIM = Penalty Minutes

See also
2018 NLL season

References

Saskatchewan Rush
Saskatchewan Rush seasons
Saskatchewan Rush